Margolles is one of eleven parishes (administrative divisions) in Cangas de Onís, a municipality within the province and autonomous community of Asturias, by northern Spain's Picos de Europa mountains.

Villages
 Agüera
 Cuencu
 La Granda
 Llanu
 Parda
 Peruyes
 Toraño
 Villa
 Viñaes

References

Parishes in Cangas de Onis